is a castle located in Fukuchiyama, Kyoto Prefecture, Japan.

History 
Fukuchiyama Castle was originally built and ruled by the Yokoyama family. Following the capture of Tanba in 1576, Akechi Mitsuhide reconstructed the castle on the foundations of the older fortification in 1580. However, the castle, along with many other castles in Japan, was destroyed in 1872 during the Meiji Restoration in the Japanese government's attempts to modernize Japan.

Today 
In 1986, the tenshu, or keep, of Fukuchiyama Castle was re-built following a spirited campaign by residents of the city of Fukuchiyama. It now serves as a local history museum. Also, a well named Toyoiwa-no-I is located in the castle, and is the deepest well of any castle in Japan. Many original stone walls still stand.

The Castle was listed as one of　the Continued Top 100 Japanese Castles in 2017.

Sources 

Welcome to Kyoto website
Kansai collection

Literature

References 

Castles in Kyoto Prefecture
Museums in Kyoto Prefecture
Akechi clan
Former castles in Japan
Ruined castles in Japan